Garrow Tor is a bare, tor-crowned hill,  high, located on Garrow Downs in the northwest of Bodmin Moor in the county of Cornwall, England, UK.

At the summit of Garrow Tor are granite rock outcrops and the hill also bears extensive evidence of early settlement, including a massive stone hedge, Bronze Age settlements and hut circles and Medieval settlements. Panoramic views from the summit include Caradon Hill to the south, Rough Tor and Brown Willy to the north, Butter's Tor to the east, clay country to the west and the Atlantic Ocean to the northwest. .

The De Lank River runs past the eastern flank of the tor from north to south, before swinging southwest around the southern foot of the hill. King Arthur's Hall lies a kilometre to the southwest.

When visiting the hill, a useful place to park is by the waterworks to the southwest.

References 

Hills of Cornwall
Bodmin Moor